Eurema brigitta, the small grass yellow or broad-bordered grass yellow, is a small butterfly of the family Pieridae, that is, the yellows and whites. It is found in India, other parts of Asia, Australia and Africa.

Description

The wingspan is 30–35 mm. Adults are on the wing year-round.

Food plants
The larvae feed on Hypericum aethiopicum and Chamaecrista mimosoides.

Subspecies
E. b. brigitta – tropical Africa
E. b. pulchella (Boisduval, 1833) – Madagascar, Mauritius, Comoro Islands, Aldabra Islands
E. b. drona (Horsfield, [1829]) – Sumatra, Java to Lombok
E. b. senna (C.&R.Felder, [1865]) – Peninsular Malaya, Singapore, Indochina
E. b. fruhstorferi (Moore, 1906) – eastern Indo-China
E. b. ina Eliot, 1956 – southern Sulawesi
E. b. hainana (Moore, 1878) – Hainan
E. b. rubella (Wallace, 1867) – Sri Lanka, India, Burma to southern China, Nicobars
E. b. formosana Matsumura, 1919 – Taiwan
E. b. yunnana (Mell)
E. b. australis (Wallace, 1867) – Australia, New Guinea, Papua New Guinea

Gallery

See also

List of butterflies of India
List of butterflies of India (Pieridae)

References

 
 
 
 
 

brigitta
Butterflies described in 1780
Butterflies of Asia
Butterflies of Africa
Butterflies of Indochina
Taxa named by Pieter Cramer